American rapper J. Cole has released six studio albums, one live album, four compilation albums, three extended plays, three mixtapes, 56 singles (including 22 as a featured artist), two promotional singles and twenty one music videos. J. Cole first took up rapping in his teens, collaborating with the local Fayetteville hip hop duo Bomm Sheltuh. The Come Up, his debut mixtape, was released on May 4, 2007, to positive reception. Following the release of The Come Up, J. Cole was contacted by American rapper Jay Z and subsequently signed to his record label Roc Nation. Cole released his second mixtape The Warm Up on June 15, 2009. "Lights Please", the first single from The Warm Up, peaked at number nine on the United States Billboard Bubbling Under R&B/Hip-Hop Singles chart and became Cole's first entry on a national record chart. He was later featured on "All I Want Is You", a 2010 single by American R&B singer Miguel – it peaked at number 58 on the US Billboard Hot 100. J. Cole's third mixtape Friday Night Lights was released on November 12, 2010.

J. Cole released his debut studio album Cole World: The Sideline Story on September 27, 2011. It debuted at number one on the US Billboard 200, with first-week sales of 218,000 copies. The album's lead single "Work Out" peaked at number thirteen on the Billboard Hot 100 and became a top-ten hit on the Billboard Hot R&B/Hip-Hop Songs and Hot Rap Songs charts. Cole World: The Sideline Story was later certified platinum by the Recording Industry Association of America (RIAA), while "Work Out" was certified two times platinum. Two more singles were released from the album: "Can't Get Enough" and "Nobody's Perfect", which peaked at numbers 52 and 61 respectively on the Hot 100. J. Cole's second studio album Born Sinner was released on June 18, 2013. Its lead single, "Power Trip", peaked at number 19 on the Hot 100 and received a platinum certification from the RIAA. On December 9, 2014, he released his third studio album 2014 Forest Hills Drive. The album was supported by four singles: "Apparently", "Wet Dreamz", "No Role Modelz" and "Love Yourz". The album sold 353,000 copies in its first week, and became the first rap album in 25 years to be certified platinum in the US with no guest appearances. The songs "No Role Modelz" and "Wet Dreamz" later received a platinum certification from the RIAA.

In addition to his fourth album, Cole released three singles in 2016: "Love Yourz", "Everybody Dies", and "False Prophets". His album 4 Your Eyez Only was released on the second anniversary of 2014 Forest Hill Drive. 4 Your Eyez Only was certified gold before it debuted at number one on the Billboard 200, despite having no singles upon release. "Deja Vu" was later given a single release after peaking at number 7 on the Hot 100. J. Cole's fifth album KOD was also commercial success, as both the album and its individual tracks broke numerous streaming and chart placement records. J. Cole became the first musician ever to debut three new songs inside the top 10 on the Billboard Hot 100. As a result of sales and streaming figures, he was the first recording artist to have a trio of tracks open inside the uppermost tier at the same time, with "ATM", "Kevin's Heart", and "KOD". Cole also managed to tie with the Beatles in simultaneously having six positions in the top 20 on the Hot 100 chart, a record that the rock band had previously held for 54 years.

Studio albums

Live albums

Compilations

EPs

Mixtapes

Singles

As lead artist

As featured artist

Other charted songs

Guest appearances

Music videos

As lead artist

As featured artist

Notes

References

External links
 Official website
 J. Cole at AllMusic
 

Discographies of American artists
Hip hop discographies
Discography